Shi Zhiyu may refer to:

Chih-yu Shih (born 1958), Taiwanese political scientist
Domee Shi (born 1989),  Chinese-born Canadian animator, director and screenwriter